is a former Japanese football player and manager. He played for Japan national team.

Club career
Kusaki was born in Kyoto Prefecture on April 12, 1962. After graduating from high school, he joined Yanmar Diesel in 1981. The club won 1983 and 1984 JSL Cup. He moved to Gamba Osaka in 1992. He moved to his local club Kyoto Purple Sanga in 1994. He retired in 1994.

National team career
On January 27, 1988, Kusaki debuted for Japan national team against United Arab Emirates. He played 2 games for Japan in 1988.

Coaching career
After retirement, Kusaki signed with Sagawa Express Osaka in 1997 and became a manager in 1998. He managed until 1999. Through a coach for Sagan Tosu, he signed with ALO's Hokuriku in 2003. He managed until 2006. Through Kansai University of International Studies and Seibi University manager, he signed with Amitie SC Kyoto. He was sacked in September 2017.

Club statistics

National team statistics

References

External links

Japan National Football Team Database

1962 births
Living people
Association football people from Kyoto Prefecture
Japanese footballers
Japan international footballers
Japan Soccer League players
J1 League players
Japan Football League (1992–1998) players
Cerezo Osaka players
Gamba Osaka players
Kyoto Sanga FC players
Japanese football managers
Association football midfielders
Association football forwards